Westport (formerly Beall's Landing) is an unincorporated community in Mendocino County, California, United States.

The first post office at Westport opened in 1879. Originally called Beall's Landing in honor of Samuel Beall, its first white settler, the place was renamed in 1877 by James T. Rodgers, who built a timber loading facility for the name to contrast with his home town of Eastport, Maine.

As of July 2010, the population of Westport was 60. It has a community store with gas pumps, several inns, and, as of 2020, nine Airbnb or VRBO rental homes.

Westport and its vicinity have been the locale of several disappearances and homicides over the years, including:

 Linda Lee Lovell and Stephen Locke Packard, disappeared in June 1974;
 Christine and Craig Langford, disappeared in January 1981;

 Harlan Sutherland, homicide victim, remains found in August 1987;
 Clyde William Stanley, homicide victim, remains found in March 1988;
 Donald James Cavanaugh and David Virgil Neily, disappeared in March 2005 and April 2006, respectively, from the same address;
 Matthew Coleman, murdered in August 2011;
 Abigail, Ciera, Devonte, Hannah, Jeremiah, and Markis Hart, all murdered by their adoptive mothers, Jen and Sarah Hart, on March 26, 2018, when their SUV intentionally drove over a cliff in a mass murder-suicide, two miles north of Westport. The family had been living in Washington State before the road trip which culminated in the fatal crash. Both perpetrators were known to have abused their six children before the crash.
 Timothy Sweet is suspected of being murdered by his half brother on September 12, 2021.

See also
Dodge Gulch
Westport-Union Landing State Beach

References

Unincorporated communities in California
Unincorporated communities in Mendocino County, California
Populated coastal places in California